David Nathan Schreiner (March 5, 1921 – June 21, 1945) was an American football player. From Lancaster in southwest Wisconsin, he was a two-time All-American and the 1942 Big Ten Most Valuable Player end at Wisconsin and a 1943 second round draft choice of the Detroit Lions of the National Football League. While in college, he worked in a girls' dormitory cafeteria to earn spending money, although his family was comfortable financially. He was mortally wounded in action by a sniper as a Marine on June 20, 1945, during the Battle of Okinawa and died the next day. He was elected to the College Football Hall of Fame in 1955. His life and death are detailed in the book Third Down and a War to Go, written by Terry Frei, the son of Jerry Frei, one of Schreiner's teammates on the 1942 Wisconsin Badgers football team.

References

Further reading

External links

1921 births
1945 deaths
All-American college football players
American football ends
Military personnel from Wisconsin
United States Marine Corps personnel killed in World War II
College Football Hall of Fame inductees
People from Lancaster, Wisconsin
Players of American football from Wisconsin
United States Marine Corps officers
Wisconsin Badgers football players
Deaths by firearm in Japan